The Elbrook Formation is a geologic formation in West Virginia, Maryland, and Pennsylvania. It dates back to the Cambrian period. Fossils of trilobite fragments have been discovered, but they are rare. The Elbrook Formation is not considered fossiliferous.

References

 Generalized Stratigraphic Chart for West Virginia

Cambrian West Virginia